Class S12 is a diesel multiple-unit (DMU), built for Sri Lanka Railways by China's CSR Corporation. The first batch arrived in Sri Lanka in August 2012.  They were built to replace locomotive-hauled passenger trains.  Seven of the S12 DMUs were ordered to strengthen long-distance travel on the Main line from Colombo to Badulla.  Four of S12s will serve the Kelani Valley Line.  The remaining two designed as luxury trains.

History 
The S12 DMUs were meant to improve services on the Main Line and the Kelani Valley Line.  The steep slopes on the up-country portion of the Main Line is difficult to operate.  Prior to the S12, only a few models of locomotives were capable of operating this line.  As DMUs started to replace locomotive-operated trains on other lines, the up-country Main Line could not be operated by DMUs.  The S12 is the first DMU to handle these conditions.

The locomotives are purchased under a USD 101 million credit line agreement with China.  The loan would be settled within 15 years.

In September 2012, the first units had trial runs.  The first Main-Line train using the S12 began on 23 October 2012.

Current fleet details

Current operations 
Main Line sets
 Colombo Fort - Kandy / Matale - Badulla

Office sets
 Colombo Fort - Polgahawela - Rambukkana
 Colombo Fort - Negambo
Colombo Fort-Kosgama

Luxury sets
 Colombo Fort - Anuradapura - Pallai
 Kandy - Ella

References 

S12
Diesel multiple units with locomotive-like power cars
Train-related introductions in 2012